Maeve Dermody (born 2 November 1985) is a UK-based Australian actress. After a film appearance at 5 years old, her adult acting career has included work in Australian and British television, theatre, short films, and movies. She characterises her own acting goal as "to be able to play different characters every time, without traces of myself".

Early life 
She is the daughter of Susan Murphy Dermody, a film theorist, historian, director, and Zen Roshi (teacher). Her father is a psychologist. Dermody's family encouraged a love of literature and the arts, and supported performing as well - her mother gave Dermody her first part when she was 5 years old in the film her mother directed Breathing Under Water (1993). Dermody attended Mosman High School in Sydney with a near-perfect UAI. During high school she was active in drama classes, as well as the Australian Theatre for Young People, and furthered her acting education with several courses at the National Institute of Dramatic Art in Sydney.

Career 
While still in high school, Dermody began getting roles in Australian television series such as All Saints (1998), and in short films. Her first major film role was in the independent thriller Black Water (2007), about a trio of people trapped in the mangroves of the Northern Territory by a menacing saltwater crocodile. Dermody's performance in Black Water earned her multiple nominations for Best Supporting Actress awards in the Australian film industry. Her next major film role was in Beautiful Kate (2009), for which she was again nominated for the AFI Best Supporting Actress Award. She had a lead role in the 2010 film Griff the Invisible, and in the 2012 miniseries Bikie Wars: Brothers in Arms.

In 2013, Dermody starred as Claire Simpson in the 10-part Australian-Singaporean TV drama series Serangoon Road.

Dermody is also active in the Australian theatre, having appeared in productions such as Killer Joe, Measure for Measure, Our Town, and The Seagull, for major theatre companies in Sydney.

In Christmas 2015, Dermody starred as Vera Claythorne in BBC One's version of Agatha Christie's thriller And Then There Were None.

Filmography

Film

Television

Music videos

Theatre

Awards and nominations

References

External links 

Actresses from Sydney
Australian film actresses
1985 births
Living people
Australian expatriates in England